Sheriff of Wichita is a 1949 American Western film directed by R. G. Springsteen and written by Robert Creighton Williams. The film stars Allan Lane, Eddy Waller, Roy Barcroft, Lyn Wilde, Clayton Moore and Gene Roth. The film was released on January 22, 1949, by Republic Pictures.

Plot

Cast    
Allan Lane as Sheriff Rocky Lane
Black Jack as Black Jack
Eddy Waller as Nugget Clark
Roy Barcroft as Sam Stark
Lyn Wilde as Nancy Bishop
Clayton Moore as Raymond D'Arcy
Gene Roth as Howard Thornton 
Trevor Bardette as Captain Ira Flanders
House Peters, Jr. as Deputy Jack Thorpe
Earle Hodgins as Jess Jenkins
Edmund Cobb as U.S. Marshal James
John Hamilton as Prison Warden
Steve Raines as Henchman Will
Jack O'Shea as Henchman Joe

References

External links 
 

1949 films
American Western (genre) films
1949 Western (genre) films
Republic Pictures films
Films directed by R. G. Springsteen
American black-and-white films
1940s English-language films
1940s American films